Sir Roger Twisden, 2nd Baronet (12 October 1640 – 28 February 1703) was an English politician who sat in the House of Commons from 1689 to 1690.

Twisden was the son of Sir Thomas Twisden, 1st Baronet and his wife Jane Tomlinson, daughter of John Tomlinson. Twisden succeeded to the baronetcy of Bradbourne, Kent on the death of his father on 2 January 1683.

Twisden was elected Member of Parliament (MP) for Rochester in 1689 and held the seat until 1690.

Twisden married Margaret Marsham, daughter of Sir John Marsham in 1667.

Twisden lived at Bradbourne, Kent and died suddenly aged 62 on 28 February 1703.

Sir Roger Twisden, 6th Baronet
Sir Roger Twisden, 6th Bt. was born on 7 November 1737. He was the son of Sir Roger Twisden, 5th Bt. and Elizabeth Watton. He married Rebecca Wildash, daughter of Isaac Wildash and Rebecca Tyhurst, on 25 January 1779. He died on 5 October 1779 at age 41, without male heir. He graduated from Oxford University, Oxford, Oxfordshire, on 5 July 1759 with a Master of Arts (M.A.). He succeeded to the title of 6th Baronet Twisden, of Bradbourne, Kent on 7 March 1772. Rebecca (his widow) became the owner of the Manor of 'Herst Hall' in Murston.

References

1640 births
1703 deaths
Baronets in the Baronetage of England
English MPs 1689–1690